Year 1377 (MCCCLXXVII) was a common year starting on Thursday (link will display the full calendar) of the Julian calendar.

Events 
 January–December 
 January – Battle of Đồ Bàn: Trần Duệ Tông, Trần dynasty Emperor of Đại Việt (Vietnam), is killed.
 January 17 – Pope Gregory XI moves the Papacy back from Avignon to Rome. 
 January 27 – The Bad Parliament begins sitting in England. Influenced by John of Gaunt, 1st Duke of Lancaster, it undoes the work done by the Good Parliament, the previous year, to reduce corruption in the Royal Council. It also introduces a poll tax.
 February – The Pope's representative in northern Italy, Robert of Geneva (the future antipope Clement VII), pillages Cesena, and 4,000 antipapal rebels are massacred.
 March 2 – The Bad Parliament dissolves. 
 March 13 – Trần Phế Đế succeeds his late father as ruler of Vietnam.
 May 
 Continuous riots in Rome induce Pope Gregory XI to move temporarily back to Avignon.
 Władysław II Jagiełło succeeds his father, Algirdas, as Grand Duke of Lithuania. Jagiello removes his uncle, Kęstutis, as co-ruler.
 May 22 – Pope Gregory XI issues five Bulls condemning the opinion of John Wycliffe, that Catholic priests should live in poverty, like the twelve disciples of Jesus.
 July 16 – Richard II, the 10-year-old grandson of Edward III, is crowned king of England. A minority government is established, and a series of continual councils rule on his behalf until 1381.
 July 27 – Fourteen-year-old Maria of Sicily succeeds her father, Frederick the Simple.
 August – The Hongwu Emperor of the Ming dynasty of China scraps the Office of Reports Inspection (established in 1370) for a new Office of Transmission, in his efforts to create a more efficient communicatory system in the empire. A month before this he noted that anyone could send memorials to the throne; commoners often did, although the only times their petitions were read aloud to the emperor were when they called for the impeachment of local officials who were not up to par with their official duties.
 August 2 – Battle on Pyana River: The Russians are defeated, while their commander drowns in the river.
 October 13 – Richard II of England's first parliament meets. 
 October 26 – Tvrtko I of Bosnia is crowned.

 Date unknown 
 Sayf ad-Din Barquq leads a revolt against the Mamluk Sultan of Egypt, Alah-ad-Din Ali.
 A rebellion against the Majapahit Empire is quashed in Sumatra.
 Informed that Khan Urus of the White Horde has died, Timur of the Timurid Empire sends Tokhtamysh to take the Horde throne, but is defeated by Urus' son, Timur Malik.
 Radu I succeeds Vladislav I as Prince of Wallachia (modern-day southern Romania).
 Harihara II succeeds Bukka Raya I, as ruler of the Vijayanagara Empire (in modern-day southern India).
 King U of Goryeo adopts the Ming calendar and begs to be invested by the Hongwu Emperor.
 The Trezzo sull'Adda Bridge is completed, and becomes the longest arch bridge in the world to be built for four centuries.
 A sermon by a German monk states "the game of cards has come to us this year", and prohibitions against cards are issued by Prince John of Castile, and the cities of Florence and Basel.

Births 
 February 15 – King Ladislaus of Naples (d. 1414)
 August 1 – Emperor Go-Komatsu of Japan (d. 1433)
 August 20 – Shahrukh Mirza, ruler of Persia and Transoxiania (d. 1447)
 September 19 – Albert IV, Duke of Austria (d. 1404)
 December 5 – Jianwen Emperor of China (d. 1402)
 date unknown
 Louis II of Anjou (d. 1417)
 Filippo Brunelleschi, Italian architect (d. 1446)
 Anglesia Visconti, queen consort of Cyprus  (d. 1439)
 Ernest, Duke of Austria (d. 1424)
 Oswald von Wolkenstein, Austrian poet (d. 1445)
 Stefan Lazarević, Despot of Serbia (d. 1427)
 Đurađ Branković, Despot of Serbia (d. 1456)
 Guru Ravidas, (d. 1528)

Deaths 
 January 27 – Frederick the Simple, King of Sicily (b. 1341)
 March 16 or March 17 – Marie de St Pol, Countess of Pembroke and Foundress of Pembroke College, Cambridge (b. c.1303)
 April – Guillaume de Machaut, French poet and composer (b. c.1300)
 April 23 or July 11 – Richardis of Schwerin, queen consort of Sweden (b. 1347)
 May – Algirdas, Grand Prince of Lithuania
 June 21 – King Edward III of England (b. 1312)
 date unknown
 Ibn Battuta, Moroccan explorer (b. 1304)
 Vladislav I, Prince of Wallachia

References